William Cameron McKay (1824–1893) was a scout in the Snake War and Modoc War, a Captain in the U.S. Army, a member of the Warm Springs Scouts, and a physician and surgeon.

William Cameron McKay was born at Fort George on May 18, 1824, what is now Astoria, Clatsop County, Oregon.  He was the son of a famous trapper and guide Thomas McKay and his wife, Timmee T'lkul Tchinouk, daughter of Tshinouk (Chinook) chief Concomly. He was a grandson of Alexander MacKay and  the step-grandson of Dr. John McLoughlin.

Educated by his step-grandfather, he was sent with his brothers to be educated in the Eastern United States in 1838.  At the age of 19 he was licensed to practice medicine.

He commanded a group of Warm Springs Indians that served as scouts for the U.S. Army in the Snake War a campaign against the Northern Paiute in 1866–1868.

He was appointed on several occasions to serve as doctor at both the Warm Springs and Umatilla reservations.

He died on January 2, 1893, aged 74, in Pendleton, Umatilla County, Oregon.  He was buried in the Olney Cemetery in that city.

References

Oregon Country
People of Oregon Territory
1824 births
1893 deaths
Oregon pioneers
Canadian Métis people
Physicians from Oregon